The Bornean frogmouth (Batrachostomus mixtus) is bird species in the family Podargidae.  Some taxonomists consider it to be a subspecies of the short-tailed frogmouth, but others consider it to be a distinct species.  It is found in Indonesia and Malaysia and is endemic to the island of Borneo.  Its natural habitats are subtropical or tropical moist lowland forest and subtropical or tropical moist montane forest.  It is threatened by habitat loss.

The species was discovered by Charles Hose on Mount Dulit in Sarawak, Borneo, and described by Richard Bowdler Sharpe in 1892 for the Bulletin of the British Ornithologists' Club.

References

External links
 

Batrachostomus
Endemic birds of Borneo
Birds described in 1892
Taxa named by Richard Bowdler Sharpe
Taxonomy articles created by Polbot
Fauna of the Borneo montane rain forests